Paul Whitehead is a British painter and graphic artist known for his surrealistic album covers for artists on the Charisma Records label in the 1970s, such as Genesis and Van der Graaf Generator.


Life and work

England: Liberty Records and Charisma Records
An art show in London in the mid-sixties led to Whitehead being picked up as an in-house artist for the London office of Jazz record label Liberty Records. Previously, he had been studying at the University of Oxford on an art scholarship. The first record cover he designed was for a repackaged Fats Domino album. This was followed by a series of work for other reissues for the UK market. In 1968, Whitehead became the original art director for Time Out in London magazine, which led him to further commissions for album covers.

After a meeting with producer John Anthony, Whitehead was introduced to Tony Stratton-Smith, the founder of Charisma Records. Stratton-Smith introduced Whitehead to Genesis, and he was hired to do the cover to their 1970 album, Trespass. Charisma Records allowed Whitehead complete creative control over his work. Fruitful work in collaboration with Genesis, Van der Graaf Generator, Lindisfarne, and Peter Hammill followed at Charisma. Additionally, Whitehead is also credited as a performer on the Peter Hammill albums Fool's Mate (drums) and In Camera (percussion).

United States
In 1973, Whitehead moved to Los Angeles, where he continued to work on album covers as a freelancer. He is still most associated with progressive rock, and designed the 2000 logo for NEARfest.

As a founder of the Eyes and Ears Foundation, he conceived of and organised the "Drive Though Art Gallery" Artboard Festival in February 1977, where artists painted on donated billboards. He has also created murals and designed corporate logos. Whitehead was in the Guinness Book of World Records for the largest indoor mural, which he painted at the Vegas World casino (since demolished and replaced by the Stratosphere casino) in Las Vegas.

Selected artworks

Album covers

Genesis
1970 Trespass
1971 Nursery Cryme
1972 Foxtrot
1973 Genesis Live (lettering only)
Van der Graaf Generator
1970 H to He, Who Am the Only One
1971 Pawn Hearts
Peter Hammill
1971 Fool's Mate
1973 Chameleon in the Shadow of the Night
Le Orme
1975 Smogmagica
2001 Elementi
2004 L'infinito
Alex Carpani
2004 Waterline
2010 The Sanctuary
Other
1968 Johnny Hallyday – Rêve et Amour 
1969 High Tide – Sea Shanties
1971 Renaissance – Illusion
1975 Tom Fogerty - Myopia
2001 Submarine Silence - Submarine Silence
2004 Various artists - The Colossus of Rhodes
2004 Systems Theory - Soundtracks for Imaginary Movies
2006 Akacia - Fading Time
2007 Systems Theory - Codetalkers
2007 Holding Pattern - Breaking the Silence
2013 Days Between Stations - In Extremis
2014 Gnu Quartet - Karma
2018 Fernando Perdomo - Out to Sea
2018 Robbie Gennet - Gleams
2019 Fernando Perdomo  - Out to Sea 2
2020 Fernando Perdomo  - Out to Sea 3

Miscellaneous

1977 "Solar Carte" (mural)
1978 Armando Gallo - Genesis: The Evolution of a Rock Band (book cover)
2001 Kevin Holm-Hudson - Progressive Rock Reconsidered (book cover "Storm In a Teacup")

References

External links

World of Genesis interview
Paul Whitehead Turns It On Again for Genesis

Fantastic art
Album-cover and concert-poster artists
Genesis (band)
British expatriates in the United States
Alumni of the University of Oxford
Living people
Year of birth missing (living people)